The Isaac Region is a local government area located in Central Queensland, Queensland, Australia created in March 2008 as a result of the report of the Local Government Reform Commission released in July 2007.

History
Yagalingu is an Australian Aboriginal language of Central Queensland. Its traditional language region was within the local government area of Isaac Region, from the headwaters of the Belyando River south to Avoca, north to Laglan, west to the Great Dividing Range, and east and south to Drummond Range.

Prior to 2008, the Isaac Region was an entire area of three previous and distinct local government areas:
 the Shire of Belyando;
 the Shire of Broadsound (taking its name from Broad Sound);
 and the Shire of Nebo.

The report recommended that the new local government area should not be divided into wards and elect eight councillors and a mayor.

The region takes its name from the Isaac River, which in turn takes its name from Queensland pioneer Frederick Isaac who accompanied the explorer Ludwig Leichhardt on his first expedition.

Towns and localities
The Isaac Region includes the following settlements:

Belyando area:
 Belyando
 Blair Athol*
 Clermont
 Elgin
 Frankfield
 Kilcummin
 Laglan
 Mistake Creek
 Moranbah
 Winchester

Broadsound area:
 Carmila
 Clairview
 Clarke Creek
 Dysart
 Flaggy Rock
 Greenhill
 Ilbilbie
 Mackenzie River
 Middlemount
 St Lawrence
 The Percy Group
 Valkyrie

Nebo area:
 Coppabella
 Elphinstone
 Glenden
 Nebo
 Suttor

* - The former town of Blair Athol, obliterated by the Blair Athol coal mine was within the region.

Islands
Isaac also includes several uninhabited islands, including the Flat Isles, with Avoid Island, which is an important habitat for the flatback sea turtle.

Libraries
Isaac Regional Council operates public libraries in Carmila, Clermont, Dysart, Glenden, Middlemount, Moranbah, Nebo, and St Lawrence.

Mayors
 2008–2012:  Cedric Marshall
 2012–2016: Anne Baker
 2016–present : Anne Michelle Baker

Population 
The populations given relate to the component entities prior to 2008.

References

External links
 Isaac Regional Council - Local Transition Committee
  Isaac Regional Council

 
Local government areas of Queensland
Central Queensland
2008 establishments in Australia